The House Without a Christmas Tree is a 1972 television movie, novelized into a children's book by Gail Rock in 1974, that centers on the relationship between Adelaide "Addie" Mills (Lisa Lucas), a bright and energetic only child, and her melancholy father, James Addison Mills III (Jason Robards). James had never recovered from the death of his wife Helen (Addie's mother), and is bitterly against ever having a Christmas tree in the house. The videotaped production was seen regularly on CBS during the holiday season between 1972 and 1977.

Plot synopsis
In fictional Clear River, Nebraska in 1946, 10-year-old Addie Mills is a lonely child who wears large horn-rimmed glasses, living in a plain, ordinary house with her widowed father James and her loving paternal grandmother.

Addie's mother died from pneumonia a few months after she was born, and her embittered father wonders why his beloved wife had to die rather than their sickly baby. Her first name is taken from her father's middle name, but his only interaction with Addie seems to be in frequent corrections of her. There has never been a Christmas tree in the Mills home since his wife's death, although Addie constantly challenges this omission.

Addie finally wins her class Christmas tree in a supervised contest between Gloria Cott and herself...via a guessing technique learned from her father. When she brings the prize home, both she and her grandmother are delighted at the prospect of their first Christmas with a tree. James angrily orders the tree removed; he even accuses Addie of cheating Gloria to win it. His mother speaks up, reminding him that the house belongs to her; he responds by threatening to take Addie and move out, leaving her alone in the house. Late that night, Addie sneaks the tree out of the house and surreptitiously donates it to Gloria—the only other student in her class who also goes treeless at Christmas, since the Cotts are too poor to afford one.

The next morning, James delivers some cookies (baked by his mother) to the Cott residence. Seeing their new tree, he recognizes it as the same one his daughter had brought home...and which he had demanded she get rid of. James, realizing just how selfish and unkind he has been towards his daughter, rethinks his position. That afternoon, James comes home with a tree and several boxes of ornaments, except a star. James goes up to the attic and brings down just such a star as he had not brought home, much more magnificently-made than the one Addie had created for her prize tree. As Addie admires the star, her father reveals that her mother had crafted it especially for her much-longed-for baby's first Christmas. Then he lifts Addie up, allowing her to place her star on the tree.

An adult Addie narrates over the final scene; over the ensuing years, her grandmother dies, and Addie moves away to a big city, but returns to Clear River each year to spend Christmas with her father, who always has a Christmas tree waiting, upon which to place the beloved star.

Characters
 Lisa Lucas as Addie Mills
 Jason Robards as James Addison Mills III, Addie's father
 Mildred Natwick as Sarah Mills, Addie's grandmother
 Kathryn Walker as Miss Peggy Thompson, Addie's schoolteacher
 Alexa Kenin as Carla Mae Carter, Addie's best friend
 Patricia Hamilton as the narrator/adult Addie Mills (uncredited)
 Brady McNamara as Billy Wild, Addie's classmate
Gail Dusome as Gloria Cott, the girl who couldn't afford a Christmas tree

Production
Originally shown on CBS on December 3, 1972, this movie was actually a very low-budget film produced on videotape instead of 35mm film. John J. O'Connor, the television critic for The New York Times, highly praised the program. In his review, O'Connor observed that "what could have been cloyingly sticky was kept, in an unusually sensitive script by Eleanor Perry, gently perceptive. For one thing, the characterization of Addie did not fall into the Sunnybrook Farm mold typical of most little girls on TV. This one, wearing glasses, made no apologies for being a precocious Miss Know‐It‐All. For another, Paul Bogart's direction was intelligent, helped considerably by fine performances from Jason Robards as the father, Lisa Lucas as Addie and, especially, Mildred Natwick as the grandmother." He summed up his critique by saying "CBS would seem to have another Christmas perennial on its hands." (The New York Times article "TV: 'Tis The Season for Family Entertainment" by John J. O'Connor - December 6, 1972, p. 95). As a result of its critical acclaim and high ratings, the program was repeated several times in the 1970s, on CBS, during the holiday season. The following year, a sequel was presented over the CBS Television Network on November 18, 1973. The special, entitled The Thanksgiving Treasure featured essentially the same cast with the exception of guest star Barnard Hughes, as James Mills's nemesis Walter Renquist, and Frannie Michel who replaced Alexa Kenin as Addie's best friend.

Once again, John J. O'Connor of The New York Times was quite impressed with the program. In his review, he wrote "this time around, Addie took her classroom Thanksgiving lesson seriously enough to attempt friendship with one of her father's old enemies, an elderly misanthrope living as a recluse on a nearby farm. After a slow beginning, dawdling too long around school scenes, the hour settled effectively and touchingly on the central relationship of the story. Again, the acting — particularly by the remarkable Miss Lucas — was fine, the photography excellent and the graphics, used as 'bridges' between scenes, were superb." (The New York Times article - "TV: The Holiday Menu" by John J. O'Connor - November 23, 1973, p. 72). It, too, was rebroadcast a few times during the 1970s. After that, two more sequels were produced - The Easter Promise, presented on March 29, 1975 over the CBS Television Network featured guest star Jean Simmons and Addie and The King of Hearts broadcast on CBS on February 25, 1976, in which the guest stars were Diane Ladd and Richard Hatch. By this time, however, the annual series had run its course and no further installments were produced. In 1991, The House Without A Christmas Tree was released on VHS, and then on DVD in 2007.

Each act of the story featured collages that opened and closed it between commercial breaks. The collage artist who assembled these for the story, Norman Sunshine, won an Emmy Award for them. He later assembled other collages for The Thanksgiving Treasure.

The House Without a Christmas Tree was filmed in Uxbridge, Ontario, mainly at the corner of Peel Street and Victoria Drive, where the house and school still exist. They also shot near the downtown core at Church and Brock Street West.

Awards
Eleanor Perry won a Primetime Emmy Award for Outstanding Writing Achievement In Drama Adaptation, and Paul Bogart was nominated for a Directors Guild of America Award.

Legacy
The Christmas show was so successful, it resulted in three other specials with the same cast, all likewise based on books that Gail Rock had written. In all of them, Lisa Lucas appeared as Addie Mills.
 The Thanksgiving Treasure, a Thanksgiving Day special transmitted on November 18, 1973. (On its VHS release, it was retitled The Holiday Treasure.) Patricia Hamilton, providing the voice of the older Addie Mills, narrated this special; she had not been credited in The House Without a Christmas Tree, she was credited here.
 The Easter Promise, an Easter special transmitted on March 26, 1975.
 Addie and the King of Hearts, a Valentine's Day special transmitted on February 25, 1976.

All but the last of these were highly rated and were later released on VHS. However, only The House Without a Christmas Tree was known to have been made available on DVD as of late October 2012. The original Christmas special is often recommended on a variety of lists, for both holiday viewing and such other themes as about single parents.

On November 4, 2014, the DVD Holiday Family Classics: The Thanksgiving Treasure / The House Without A Christmas Tree was released by Paramount. The release was credited as a two film collection but featured both programs on one DVD (Region 1 only). Soon after, there was another "Holiday Family Classics" DVD released by Paramount which included both The Easter Promise and Addie and the King of Hearts.

Adaptation
Houston Grand Opera commissioned an adaptation from composer Ricky Ian Gordon and librettist Royce Vavrek. The opera premiered on November 30, 2017.

See also 
 List of Christmas films

References

External links
 
 New York Times Review: A House Without a Christmas Tree
 The House Without a Christmas Tree TV and Movie Review from Goodreads.com
 A House Without a Christmas Tree at Yahoo Movies
 The Addie Mills Page

1972 films
1972 television films
1970s Christmas drama films
1970s Christmas films
American Christmas drama films
CBS network films
Christmas television films
Films adapted into operas
Films directed by Paul Bogart
Films scored by Arthur B. Rubinstein
Films set in 1946
Films set in Nebraska
Films shot in Ontario
1970s English-language films
1970s American films